The Xiling Yangtze River Bridge, is a suspension bridge over the Yangtze River, just a few kilometers downstream from the Three Gorges Dam. The bridge is located within Yiling District of the prefecture-level city of Yichang (Hubei Province of China), connecting the towns of Taipingxi and Letianxi (on the left, northern bank of the river) with Sandouping (on the right, southern bank).

The bridge is located some 50 km upstream (west) from Yichang main urban area (i.e., Xiling District). The construction started in December 1993 and was completed in 1996. The bridge opened in August 1996.) and had the longest bridge span across the Yangtze, of 900 meters.  The total length of the bridge was reported as 1118.66 meters. The bridge surface is 18 m wide, carrying two lanes of traffic in each direction.

See also
 Yiling Bridge (near Yichang's center city)
 List of longest suspension bridge spans
 List of largest bridges in China
 Yangtze River bridges and tunnels

External links

 
 Photo of the Xiling Bridge at China Railway Engineering Corporation
 Photos and location from Google Earth
 Another photo from Google Earth taken downstream

References

Suspension bridges in China
Bridges completed in 1996
Yichang
Bridges over the Yangtze River
Bridges in Hubei